Frédéric Petit (born 6 May 1975) is a former Grand Prix motorcycle road racer from France. His best years were in 1997 and 1998 when he finished in tenth place in the 125cc world championship.

References 

1975 births
Sportspeople from Saint-Maur-des-Fossés
French motorcycle racers
125cc World Championship riders
Living people